Anderson Municipal Airport  (Darlington Field) is a public use airport three miles east of Anderson in Madison County, Indiana. The National Plan of Integrated Airport Systems for 2011–2015 categorized it as a general aviation facility. The airport currently has no scheduled air service.

Previous air service
Prior to the closing of the General Motors factories in Anderson, the airport did have relatively small service to Detroit (Metro), Detroit (City), Kokomo, Buffalo, Indianapolis, and Dayton. This service, however, was very limited and intended for General Motors employees to go from factory to factory. These flights were served by snacks and even a Continental Breakfast.

Facilities
The airport covers 619 acres (251 ha) at an elevation of 919 feet (280 m). It has two asphalt runways: 12/30 is 5,400 by 100 feet (1,646 x 30 m), and runway 18/36 is 3,399 by 75 feet (1,036 x 23 m).

The airport operates its own fixed-base operator. Besides fuel, parking and ground handling, catering, deicing, GPUs, and tugs are available line services. Conference rooms, refreshments, snooze rooms, work stations, and courtesy cars are also provided. Aircraft rental, sales, and maintenance as well as pilot training are also available at the airport.

Aircraft
For the 12-month period ending December 31, 2018, the airport averaged 53 aircraft operations per day, or about 19,000 per year: 93% general aviation, 6% air taxi, and 1% military. For the same time period, 92 aircraft were based at the airport: 79 single-engine and 10 multi-engine airplanes, 2 helicopters, and 1 jet.

Accidents & Incidents
On August 15, 2004, a single-engine airplane crashed after takeoff from Anderson Airport. The aircraft was being flown on a test flight after maintenance had been done when it lost engine power and crashed off the side of a nearby state highway. The pilot was taken to the hospital with serious injuries but was stabilized.
On November 21, 2004, a Cessna 172 crashed while attempting to land at Anderson. The plane was flown by a student pilot on a solo flight. The pilot reported they were correcting for an approach above glideslope; as they tried to increase rate of descent, they stalled the plane above the runway and bounced multiple times before porpoising and striking the plane's propeller on the runway. The pilot was able to bring the plane to a landing and taxi into the FBO. The probably cause of the accident was found to be the student pilot's improper flare and inadequate recovery from a bounced landing. The pilot was not injured.
On May 5, 2019, a Piper PA-34 Seneca crashed at Anderson Airport. The sole pilot onboard was airlifted to the hospital with serious injuries.

References

External links 
 Anderson Municipal Airport at City of Anderson website
 
 Aerial image as of April 1998 from USGS The National Map
 

Airports in Indiana
Anderson, Indiana
Transportation buildings and structures in Madison County, Indiana